Sudeste Rio-Grandense (Southeast of Rio Grande) is one of the seven Mesoregions of the state of Rio Grande do Sul in Brazil. It consists of 25 municipalities, grouped in four Microregions:
 Jaguarão
 Litoral Lagunar
 Pelotas
 Serras de Sudeste

References

Mesoregions of Rio Grande do Sul